Heleomyza serrata is a species of fly in the family Heleomyzidae. It is found in the Palearctic.

References

External links
Images representing Heleomyza serrata at BOLD

Heleomyzidae
Insects described in 1758
Muscomorph flies of Europe
Taxa named by Carl Linnaeus